Chailahi is a town and Village Development Committee in Dang Deokhuri District in Lumbini Province of south-western Nepal. At the time of the 1991 Nepal census it had a population of 10,800 persons living in 1485 individual households. It lies in the east west highway and lied 23 km east to districts capital Ghorahi.

Media
To Promote local culture Chailahi has three Community radio Stations. They are Radio Deukhuri - 105.8 MHz, Radio Naya Yug - 107.3 MHz and  Radio Highway - 103.5 MHz.

References

External links
UN map of the municipalities of Dang Deokhuri District

Populated places in Dang District, Nepal